is a light gun game published  by Sega, first available as an arcade game, then ported to the Dreamcast. The game is in the same style as the Virtua Cop series or The House of the Dead series, with support for one or two players. The game was developed by Sega's Hitmaker development team and first released in 2000. Its plot is of the same vein as James Bond and Mission: Impossible. Despite it also having an arcade release, it never enjoyed the popularity of the Virtua Cop nor The House of the Dead series, which were also produced by Sega.

Plot
A group of terrorists have stolen the World's Coalition's satellite. The Confidential Mission Force (CMF) sends two of its agents, Howard Gibson and Jean Clifford, to investigate. They first infiltrate a museum, where they find out "Agares" is behind the plot of stealing the satellite. As soon as they grab the disc with the information, one of the Agares leaders prevent them from getting the disc. After they retrieve the disc, they are sent to a train traveling through the mountains. There, they find out that Agares has kidnapped satellite programmer Irina Mikhailova and forced her to reprogram the satellite. Howard and Jean manage to rescue Irina but are stopped by the General, whom they eventually defeat in a fierce firefight. With the help of Irina, CMF locates Agares Headquarters, where the satellite control is being transported to a submarine. Howard and Jean manage to make it through the base and find the Agares Ringleader, who plans to use the satellite to destroy the CMF's headquarters. After being defeated, the leader uses a self-destruct sequence on Agares's base and escapes in a submarine. If the player succeeds in the final quick time event, the two agents manage to use the satellite to destroy the submarine and deep-six the Ringleader. Howard and Jean then escape, thus saving the rest of the CMF from being destroyed.

Gameplay
Hitmaker ported this game to the Dreamcast console direct from the arcade. The idea of the mission is to infiltrate enemy headquarters using a combined assortment of weapons and gadgets.

Gameplay using a regular Dreamcast controller moving an on-screen cursor is available.

Development
The game was developed using the Sega NAOMI GD-ROM model arcade board.  It was available in the arcades in 4 configurations: Cabinet Deluxe, Sitdown, Normal and Upright.

Reception

The Dreamcast version received "average" reviews according to the review aggregation website Metacritic. Jim Preston of NextGen said, "Clearly modeled after the excellent Virtua Cop series, Confidential Mission does nothing to spice up the gameplay, with the same 'justice' and 'combo' shots we've seen before." In Japan, Famitsu gave it a score of 31 out of 40.

Also in Japan, Game Machine listed the arcade version in their January 15, 2001 issue as the second most-successful dedicated arcade game of the month.

See also
 Virtua Cop
 The House of the Dead

Notes

References

External links
 
 

2000 video games
Arcade video games
Dreamcast games
Light gun games
Sega-AM3 games
Sega arcade games
Spy video games
Video games about terrorism
Video games developed in Japan